KOZB (97.5 FM) is a radio station licensed to serve Livingston, Montana, United States. The station's licensee is held by Desert Mountain Broadcasting Licenses, LLC.

The offices and all the studios were atone time  located southwest of Bozeman at "Radio Ranch", 5445 Johnson Road but no longer there. Its transmitter site is east of Bozeman, on Bozeman Trail Road. KBOZ-FM, KOZB, and KOBB-FM all have construction permits to move to a new shared transmitter site on top of Green Mountain, along I-90 east of Bozeman.

History
The station signed on in December 1977 as KYBS. It changed its call letters to KATH in April 1993; on November 25, 1993, it became KBOZ-FM. On August 1, 1995, the station switched calls to KPKX, and on August 3, 2004 it became KOZB.

On June 1, 2018, KOZB and its sister stations went off the air.

Effective December 6, 2019, the licenses for KOZB and its sister stations were involuntary assigned from Reier Broadcasting Company, Inc. to Richard J. Samson, as Receiver. The licenses for these stations were sold to Desert Mountain Broadcasting Licenses, LLC in a deal completed in January 2022.  The station came back on the air as active rock 97.5 the Zone.

Previous Logo

References

External links

OZB
Radio stations established in 1977
1977 establishments in Montana